Pilellus is a genus of mites in the family Ologamasidae. There are at least two described species in Pilellus.

Species
These two species belong to the genus Pilellus:
 Pilellus rugipellis Lee & Hunter, 1974
 Pilellus rykei (Hunter, 1967)

References

Ologamasidae